The 2006 Marshall Thundering Herd football team represented Marshall University in the 2006 NCAA Division I FBS football season. Marshall competed as a member of the East Division of Conference USA, and played their home games at Joan C. Edwards Stadium.

Schedule

References

Marshall
Marshall Thundering Herd football seasons
Marshall Thundering Herd football